The Akureyri Botanical Garden (regionally also ) is located on the west side of the inland end of the fjord Eyjafjörður at about 45 metres elevation. It is located in the southern part of the city of Akureyri in Northern Iceland, 50 kilometres south of the Arctic Circle. It is one of the northernmost botanical gardens in the world.

In 1910, women from Akureyri founded the Park Association to beautify their city. The previous year the city had given them a hectare of land. The garden, the first public park in Iceland, was headed until 1953 by the Park Society. During this time the garden area increased to 3.6 hectares. Besides being a place of peace and tranquility the garden is a place for scientific research. It has proven that shrubs, trees and other plants can survive on the edge of the Arctic.
Jón Rögnvaldsson's plant collection was purchased by the city in 1957. Rögnvaldsson was a leading force in the garden many years, along with Margarethe Schiöth. Both of them are represented by busts in the garden, along with Akureyri clergyman Matthias Jochumsson, the poet of the Icelandic national anthem.
Besides arctic plants, those from the temperate zones and high mountains are grown. Icelandic plants are represented by about 400 species in the southeastern corner of the garden. By the end of 2007, there were about 7000 species.
In the garden there are public toilets. The entrance to the garden is free, and it is  always open.
The garden contains a few wooden houses, of which Eyrarlandsstofa is one of the oldest in Akureyri.

References

External links 
 Lystigarður Akureyrar

Akureyri
Botanical gardens in Iceland